Mayfield is a small farming settlement in Mid Canterbury, in New Zealand's South Island. It is located 35 km from Ashburton on former State Highway 72 at the intersection of the Lismore-Mayfield Road towards the top of the Canterbury Plains.  Mayfield is within the Ashburton District Council and Canterbury Regional Council boundaries. The population of the Mayfield village is around 200. The majority of the population is engaged either directly or indirectly in farming or farming related services.

Facilities
The village has a shop, garage, tavern, local transport company and rural supply store. The Mayfield domain features rugby fields, tennis and squash courts, outdoor swimming pool, rifle range, play centre, adventure playground and memorial hall.

The town has a voluntary rural fire brigade staffed by locals. The brigade uses a Isuzu tanker and 4x4 Isuzu fire appliance. The fire brigade is particularly useful since the climate and local farms are particularly prone to drought and grass fires during the summer season.

The first post office in Mayfield was established on 1 September 1879 when Mr. John Bowick was appointed Postmaster, he was also the town blacksmith and it was his house on the Mayfield-Klondike road that was the first Post Office. He was later bought out on 1 July 1881 by Mr. James Dellow, who became the local blacksmith. But it was only in mid-1889 that a post office with telegraph office and bureau was opened. The Mayfield post Office was in use from this time until it was downgraded to a volunteer Post office in 1982. Several local ladies held the position of volunteer Postmistress thereafter until the postal services were shifted to the local store.

If any one person could be considered to have founded Mayfield then it was almost certainly James Dellow. It was he who essentially invented the heavier, more robust farming gear needed when it became quite clear that the lightweight harrows and plows previously used could not handle the stony conditions and it was he who lived to see Mayfield grown from one or two houses to a functioning, prosperous settlement.

The local store burnt down in early 2008 but re-opened in early 2009.

The Mayfield Agricultural and Pastoral show takes place on the second Saturday in March each year.

In June 2006 Mayfield and the Mid Canterbury region were hit by large snowfalls disrupting power, phone and roads. Power remained cut for hundreds of households more than a week after the event making it one of the worst storms to hit the region in several decades.

A local newsletter the Mayfield Message is issued monthly and sent via the New Zealand Post to households in the local area and published on the Ashburton District Council website.

Communications
Mayfield has a Chorus owned telephone exchange providing Telephone and DSL services to the local area. The exchange is only capable of providing ADSL 1 services and the equipment is limited by its backhaul capabilities.  It is also serviced by the Electricity Ashburton and Vodafone fibre optic networks which pass through the town.  Mayfield is also serviced by the Wireless Rural Broadband Initiative and the privately operated Ruralnet.

Education
Mayfield is the location of a primary school that services the township and surrounding community. The school was opened sometime between 1880 and 1887. In 2000 the school was increased in size when the smaller Lismore  and Westerfield schools were closed. Students at these schools transferred to Mayfield. Two relocatable classrooms from Lismore were moved to Mayfield to add two additional classrooms while another building was used to extend the library/hall. Mayfield School is a decile 9 co-educational state full primary school (U2 grade) catering for New Entrants to Year 8 students. At the end of 2010 the roll was 71 students.

Secondary education is undertaken at Geraldine High School or Ashburton College, with school buses running from Mayfield to both schools.

Water Supply

Mayfield has as reticulated water supply providing water to approximately 60 properties in the village.
 The water supply was originally provided from stock water by the council. In April 2009 when the council reviewed proposals to upgrade the stock water based supply to meet new standards an alternative proposal was made by the local community to source water from a bore. The community raised funding and paid for the drilling of a well in the village and the supply was switched to the bore. Subsequently, the supply was found to be insufficient to meet demand.

Properties on the Mayfield articulated water supply have suffered from a limited water supply and as of October 2016 have been placed on Level 4 water restrictions prohibiting the use of outdoor hosepipes. In May 2016 a trial project to roll out water meters was announced by the Ashburton District Council. The District Council has sourced a portable filtration system that would use stock water as a contingency.

References 

Ashburton District
Populated places in Canterbury, New Zealand